This is a list of satellite television channels in Oromo language.

Channels with Oromo program 
 VAO 24
 BBC Horn of Africa
 Fana BC
 ETV Language
 Dimtsi Weyane
 Dire TV
 Harari TV
 Amhara TV
 Prime Media (12604-27500-(4/5)

See also
 Mass media in Ethiopia

References

Oromo language
Oromo